Railway stations in the Republic of the Congo (Congo) include:

Maps 

 UN Map
 UNHCR Atlas Map
 ReliefWeb
 UNJLC Rail map of Southern Africa
 misses line to Franceville

Stations served by passenger trains

Cities served by rail

Existing 

 Pointe-Noire - port - 0 km
 Tié-Tié
 Loandjili 
 Hinda, Congo
 Mvouti 
 Sisansinga
 Dolisie (was Loubomo) - capital of the Niari Department - near junction to Mbinda
 Monto Bélo - junction for Mbinda
 Loudima
 Nkayi (near Kayes)
 Madingou
 Mindouli
 Kibouende
 Brazzaville - capital - 512 km

 Loutété - cement works

 Monto Bello - junction for Mbinda
 Makabana
 Titi
 Moutamba 
 Mossendjo
 Mayoko - proposed iron ore mine
 Mbinda - railhead for Franceville, Gabon and former COMILOG Cableway

Timeline

2014 
 ( Sundance Iron ore railway)
  Avima, Congo - iron ore mine
  Lolabe, Cameroon - port
 (This railway is isolated from the rest of the Congo railway system)

2021 
 proposed Mayoko & Niari - Pointe-Noire railway for iron ore traffic.

Proposed 
 Brazzaville - Ouesso - Constructing 1,000 km new line - 2008
 Pointe Noire - Djambala - Constructing 500 km new line - 2008
 Pointe Noire - Zanaga - New line for iron ore.
   Brazzaville-Kinshasa Bridge
 Pointe Noire - Indienne new deep-water port for iron ore export
 2021  Pointe Noire -  Mayoko & Niari - iron ore railway

Closed 
(610mm gauge, isolated)

 Boma - port
 Lukula 
 Tshela - terminus

See also 

 Transport in the Republic of the Congo
 Railway stations in DRCongo

References 

 
Railway stations
Railway stations